Clan Akkaba is a fictional cult appearing in American comic books published by Marvel Comics. The cult has appeared in X-Men comic books and was created by Frank Tieri and Clayton Henry. The Clan is composed of the descendants of the mutant supervillain Apocalypse and first appeared in X-Men: Apocalypse vs. Dracula mini-series.

History

Origins
The name Akkaba had its origins in the time of ancient Egypt, before the arrival of the time travelling Pharaoh Rama-Tut who would one day become Kang the Conqueror and Immortus. Akkaba was a small but promising lone settlement situated on the very edge of the Amentet and the Valley of the Kings. Its members were suspicious and superstitious lot who prided themselves on their culture, which they considered separate and apart from the rest of Egypt. Their fear, however, proved to be their undoing. News spread throughout Egypt about a new Pharaoh who had fallen from the sky and seized control of the throne.

They took this as an ill omen, so when one of their lot gave birth to a gray child with blue lines running across his lips and face, they quickly cast the child out unaware that their rejection would cause the child to eventually become Apocalypse.

Not realising the value of the child they had left to die, they carried on with their simple life. This mistake would be their last, as Baal and the Sandstormers massacred them all in search of the child. Akkaba was bathed in blood. The only survivor was En Sabah Nur, the first one, so named by his new father Baal.

Domination

When Apocalypse fully realised his power and defeated the Pharaoh and his army, Egypt entered a new age, one in which his children walked among them. Apocalypse forged his clan, now called Clan Akkaba, after his birthplace and those who had abandoned him and left him to die. During this time the site of Akkaba reached somewhat of a renaissance as great monuments were erected there, whether by Apocalypse, his descendants, or by the new Pharaoh, no one knows.

The clan at this point began forming customs, whether by Apocalypse's will or their own accord. They lived by the survival of the fittest creed and the members of the clan would deceive, betray and even kill their own relations merely for a chance to be deemed closest to Apocalypse. Egypt peaked and so too did the clan's influence on the world. With attacks by Alexander the Great and his Persian armies, Apocalypse and his kin fought valiantly in a battle he would never forget. This battle helped him winnow out the weak in his clan and as Egypt became nothing but a distant memory the clan's influence moved on to Ancient Rome.

19th century

For thousands of years, Clan Akkaba had the mission of safeguarding the legacies and mantras of their lord and ancestor.

Once in the new world, they reproduced and gave birth to the biggest clan they had ever seen in their long history. They gathered many riches and placed themselves in notable and influential positions to better influence and control the world. As the clan grew, it evolved, holding true to its ‘survival of the fittest’ creed they continued to battle and kill each other to gain Apocalypse's favor. They officially adopted the formally custom of marking themselves with a blood-red tattoo of their clan's sigil, the more powerful the individual member's level of mutant power, the larger the tattoo on their body. Although it is unknown what threats they faced early on in the new world, Margarete Slade, the eldest known Akkaba member at the time, noted that when she was a girl 
she witnessed Apocalypse cut a whole tribe of N’Gari demons to pieces. Still, the current chairman Kabar Brashir, who was roughly the age of her eldest son Hamilton, had witnessed the clan summon Apocalypse thirty six years previously when he was a boy. It is unknown what these threats to the clan were but none prepared them for what lay ahead. At that time, the most prominent members of the Council were Margaret Slade and her sons Hamilton Slade, Frederick Slade, who were considered to be among the most powerful descendants of Apocalypse at that time.

Dracula

During the Victorian era the clan was set upon by Dracula and they were nearly exterminated. A string of mysterious murders started to take place surrounding members of the clan. When their leader Hamilton disappeared they were left with no choice but to summon their lord. In 1897, they awoke Apocalypse in order to deal with the threat of Dracula, unknown to the members of the clan Dracula was turning members of Clan Akkaba into vampires in order to battle Apocalypse, as revenge for his earlier defeat and the way the Dark Lord previously shamed him. As punishment for being so weak in requesting a boon from him, Apocalypse killed one of their leaders.

The ensuing battle sees the massacre and extermination of all members of Clan Akkaba except Jack Starsmore and Frederick Slade and their disbandment by decree of Apocalypse. With help from Apocalypse and Abraham Van Helsing they manage to kill Dracula, although the master vampire would frequently return and suffer many more deaths. The continuation of the Akkaba line is secured by Ozymandias through Frederick Slade mating with a woman referred to as Miss Ferguson. Ozymandias, realizing an opportunity to get revenge on Apocalypse, secretly plans to reshape the clan in his image for use against his lord eventually.

Re-Birth

The new clan Akkaba assembled recently under Ozymandias and an elderly Fredrick Slade. This new clan has also revealed that Chamber is a member of their bloodline being a descendant of Jack Starsmore. While the Starsmore family never forgot about Apocalypse, Chamber rejected their offer of membership. It is unknown where the clan's loyalties lie and what plans they have up their sleeve, but as they say Clan Akkaba will always be there.

The Apocalypse Solution

Deadpool, whom Warren Worthington had been paying to search for Clan Akkaba, finds a Celestial ship buried underground where the clan kills one of their own during a ritual. Deadpool ends up caught but not before the rest of X-Force are alerted. X-Force is able to rescue Deadpool and defeat the savage creature that attacked him but the temple itself makes a temporal jump forcing the team to retreat. Warren then comments that the creature they defeated was War and not only was the Clan trying to resurrect Apocalypse, they had also revived his final horsemen. Later it is revealed that Apocalypse has been revived as a young boy and was being taken care of by the Clan Akkaba's members themselves.

The clan was teaching him that X-Men are tricking the mutants into being locked away, telling them it's for their own good. He is told that the X-Men are tyrants and Apocalypse is the savior. That the worshipper of X (Uncanny X-Force) will come to kill him because he threatens their grip on power, and it is his birthright to usher in the salvation of homo superior by bringing about the Age of Apocalypse. When the X-Force came to kill Apocalypse, they were instead defeated by the final Horsemen of Apocalypse. Ozymandias told the young Apocalypse they should kill the X-Force but the boy did not want to kill anyone, but Ozymandias ordered the horsemen to kill them. Apocalypse had been relocated into his chamber and he asked the ship "Will there always bad people trying to kill" him to which the ship answer was: yes. Psylocke managed to reach Apocalypse chamber but after seeing that Apocalypse is a child now and has no idea about his former life she fought Archangel who wanted to kill the boy as he saw no rehabilitating could cleanse the nature of Apocalypse, and almost kills the boy but found that he can't do it. The group agree to take the boy and train him only for Fantomex to kill the boy by shooting him between his eyes.

Dark Angel Saga
After the death of Apocalypse the Death Seed in Warren has activated and he started his ascension and to become the heir of Apocalypse the Archangel persona becomes in control; due to this, he has taken control of the Clan. He and the Dark Beast traveled to Akkaba Metropolis, a large hidden underground city located underneath the North Pole, established at an unknown point in the past by the Clan Akkaba. After taking the Life Seed from the X-Force that was recurred from the Age of Apocalypse timeline and The World he used them to start a new evolution line in a location after making Genocide kill everyone in it; after seeing the result he wanted to do this to the entire planet so he, the clan and the mutants who sided with him would be seen as Gods for the new evolved creatures. He was seen in bed with Pestilence; when the plan failed and Angel was cured from the Death Seed, Dark Beast takes control of the clan under the instruction of Archangel and Pestilence is revealed to be pregnant from Archangel.

Later the Apocalypse Twins, the children of Archangel and Pestilence, travelled to the Metropolis and destroyed the city and almost decimated the Clan Akkaba in its entirety.

Dawn of X
Following the creation of the mutant nation on the island of Krakoa, the Clan Akkaba lost faith in Apocalypse when the later aligned himself with Charles Xavier's vision for the future and abandoned them, proving that he saw them as nothing but pawns. Dubbing themselves now as Coven Akkaba, they have sided with Morgana Le Fey and are now enemies of the mutant race.

Customs
 Fittest
Clan Akkaba, like everything else associated with Apocalypse, incorporates his creed ‘Survival of the fittest’ into their core. Being deemed the fittest is a title of great honor among clan members. It signifies that the individual is closest to Apocalypse in terms of power, and it also means that the individual leads Clan Akkaba in Apocalypse's absence/hibernation. To achieve the title one would have to undergo many tests and trials and ultimately battle any who questioned them and their rank.

 The Inner Council
The inner Council of Clan Akkaba were the leaders of the clan and those showing great skill or possessing enough of Apocalypse's blood to be next in line or challenge the fittest for his/her title.

 Summoning
This ritual is only performed during times of great peril. Normally the clan deal with whatever threats presented itself to them but sometimes the clan itself was in peril or they faced extinction; in times like this, Apocalypse was summoned. The consequence for asking for Apocalypse's help, however, was that one of the Inner council would be killed; since asking for Apocalypse's help meant they were weak, as the fittest should never have to ask for help.

 Secrecy
Clan Akkaba, like many of Apocalypse's subordinates, is surrounded by secrecy. In case of death, the clan removes their mark from the dead, ensuring none will know of them. They don’t speak about or refer to the clan outside of the safety of the clan house and never invite outsiders into their midst. Breaking these rules means death.

 Tattoo
Clan members are branded whether at birth or while very young. The amount of Apocalypse's blood found in the child's system or strength of the bloodline determines the size of the tattoo that one receives.  This is seen in Hamilton and Chamber, who have strong doses of Apocalypse's blood, while the murdered members in the 18th century had a tiny tattoo right behind their ear.

Powers and abilities
Each member possess a degree of Apocalypse's shape-shifting ability. Other members have shown to develop abilities of their own such as fire-breathing (Jack Starsmore), spatial displacement (Blink, Frederick Slade), and even bio-blasts (Chamber).

References

External links
 Frank Tieri on Apocalypse vs Dracula and Clan Akkaba

Comics characters introduced in 2006
Marvel Comics mutants
Comic book terrorist organizations
Characters created by Clayton Henry
Fictional families
X-Men supporting characters